Danica may refer to:

 Danica (given name), people with the given name
 Danica concentration camp, in the Independent State of Croatia
 A personification of the morning star in Slavic mythology
 Danica (magazine), a 19th-century magazine in Croatia

See also
 Danika (disambiguation)
 Danish (disambiguation), Danica in Latin